Sharon Evelin Acevedo Tangarife (born March 5, 1993) is a female rugby sevens player. She played for Colombia's women's national rugby sevens team at the 2015 Pan Am Games in Toronto. She was named in Colombia's women's 2016 Olympic sevens team.

She is the older sister of Nicole Acevedo who is also a rugby sevens player.

References

External links 
 
 

1993 births
Living people
Female rugby sevens players
Rugby sevens players at the 2015 Pan American Games
Rugby sevens players at the 2016 Summer Olympics
Colombia international rugby sevens players
Olympic rugby sevens players of Colombia
Central American and Caribbean Games gold medalists for Colombia
Competitors at the 2014 Central American and Caribbean Games
Competitors at the 2018 Central American and Caribbean Games
Rugby sevens players at the 2019 Pan American Games
Central American and Caribbean Games medalists in rugby sevens
Pan American Games competitors for Colombia
Colombia international women's rugby sevens players